Paola Arlotta (born 1971) is the Golub Family Professor of Stem Cell and Regenerative Biology at Harvard University and chair of the Harvard Stem Cell and Regenerative Biology (HSCRB). Her research focuses on the development of neuron types in the cerebral cortex. She is best known for her work using 3D cerebral organoids derived from human induced pluripotent stem cells (iPSCs) to study cortical development in neurodegenerative and neuropsychiatric disorders.

Early life and education 
Born in 1971, Arlotta grew up in Capriva del Friuli, Italy. She attended liceo scientifico Duca degli Abruzzi in Gorizia. She earned an M.S. in biochemistry from the University of Trieste and her Ph.D in molecular biology from the University of Portsmouth under the mentorship of Santa J. Ono in 2000. The title of her Ph.D thesis was "The high mobility group protein I-C: transcriptional regulation and involvement in the formation of lipomas in transgenic mice". She then completed her postdoctoral research at Harvard Medical School under the mentorship of Jeffrey Macklis at Harvard Medical School. She worked in both Boston Children's Hospital and Massachusetts General Hospital studying neurogenesis and CNS repair. She was also an instructor in Neurosurgery at Harvard Medical School until 2007.

In 2007, Arlotta joined the faculty at Harvard University with a laboratory on the Cambridge campus. She became the Morris Kahn Associate Professor of Stem Cell and Regenerative Biology as well as a Faculty at the Harvard Stem Cell Institute.  She was promoted to the Golub Family Professor of Stem Cell and Regenerative Biology at Harvard. In 2018, Arlotta was appointed the Chair of the Stem Cell Biology and was appointed to the Quantitative Biology Executive Council. She also served on the Life Sciences jury for the Infosys Prize in 2019.

Career and research 
Arlotta's research focuses on understanding the molecular factors guiding the birth, differentiation and assembly of neurons in the cerebral cortex. Her lab develops in vitro models of human cortical development and pathology using 3D cerebral organoids.

In addition to her positions in the Department of Stem Cell and Regenerative Biology at Harvard, Arlotta is also an Institute Member at the Broad Institute, an associate member of the Stanley Center for Psychiatric Research at the Broad Institute, and a principal faculty member at the Harvard Stem Cell Institute, where she is also co-director of the neuroscience program.

Awards and honors 
 George Ledlie Prize
 Fannie Cox Prize for Excellence in Science Teaching
 The Friedrich Wilhelm Bessel Research Award from the Alexander von Humboldt Foundation
 New York Stem Cell Foundation (NYSCF) Robertson Stem Cell Investigator (2011)
 George Ledlie Prize by the President and Fellows of Harvard College

Select publications

References

Further reading
 
 

Living people
Alumni of the University of Portsmouth
Harvard University faculty
Italian women biologists
Italian women neuroscientists
University of Trieste alumni
1971 births